Reaper Man is a fantasy novel by British writer Terry Pratchett. Published in 1991, it is the 11th Discworld novel and the second to focus on Death. The title is a reference to Alex Cox's movie Repo Man.

Plot

The Auditors of Reality watch the Discworld to ensure everything obeys The Rules. As Death starts developing a personality the Auditors feel that he does not perform his Duty in the right way. They send him to live like everyone else. Travelling to the Octarine Grass Country, he assumes the name "Bill Door" and he works as a farm hand for the elderly Miss Flitworth. She is a spinster whose fiancé, Rufus, died on a last smuggling expedition many years ago. There are rumours that he had had second thoughts about their marriage but she does not believe them.

While every other species creates a new Death for themselves, humans need more time for their Death to be completed. As a result, the life force of dead humans starts to build up; this results in poltergeist activity, ghosts, and other paranormal phenomena. Most notable is the return of the recently deceased wizard Windle Poons, who was really looking forward to reincarnation. After several misadventures, including being accosted by his oldest friends, he finds himself attending the Fresh Start club, an undead-rights group led by Reg Shoe. The Fresh Start club and the wizards of Unseen University discover that the city of Ankh-Morpork is being invaded by a parasitic lifeform that feeds on cities and hatches from eggs that resemble snow globes. Tracking its middle form, shopping trolleys, the Fresh Start club and the wizards invade and destroy the third form, a shopping mall.

When humankind finally thinks of a New Death, one with a crown and without any humanity or human face, it comes to take Bill Door. Death/Door, having planned for this moment for some time, outwits and destroys it. Having defeated the New Death, Death absorbs the other Deaths back into him, with the exception of the Death of Rats (and ultimately, the Death of Fleas). Death confronts Azrael, the Death of the Universe, and states that the Deaths have to care or they do not exist and there is nothing but Oblivion, which must also end some time.

Death asks for and receives some time. He meets up with Miss Flitworth again and offers her unlimited dreams. She asks to go to the local Harvest Dance. They prepare and join the townspeople for a full night of dancing.

As the sun is coming up, Miss Flitworth realizes she had died hours before the dance even started. Death escorts her through back history to her old fiancé: as she had believed, he had died in an accident and not been unfaithful. The young couple enter the afterlife together.

Returning to the city of Ankh-Morpork, Death meets up with Windle Poons, finally taking him to his afterlife. At the end there is also a discussion between Death and the Death of Rats over what the Death of Rats should "ride", Death suggests a dog while the Death of Rats suggests a cat.

Characters

Death / Bill Door
Renata Flitworth
Auditors of Reality
Azrael
New Death
Death of Rats
Windle Poons
Mustrum Ridcully
The Librarian
The Senior Wrangler
The Dean
The Bursar
The Lecturer in Recent Runes
Lupine
Ludmilla Cake
Mrs. Cake
Reg Shoe
Schleppel
Mr. Ixolite
Arthur Winkings (Count Notfaroutoe)
Doreen Winkings (Countess Notfaroutoe)

Adaptations
A fragment of this book was adapted in 1996 into a short animated movie entitled Welcome to the Discworld, featuring Christopher Lee as Death.

References

External links

 
YouTube - Welcome To The Discworld
Annotations for Reaper Man
Quotes from Reaper Man

1991 British novels
Discworld books
1991 fantasy novels
Novels about death
Alien invasions in novels
British novels adapted into films
Novels about personifications of death
Victor Gollancz Ltd books
British comedy novels